Virovsko is a village in Vratsa Municipality, Vratsa Province, Bulgaria.

See also
 Vratsa

References
 

Villages in Vratsa Province